Morlaix – Ploujean Airport  is an airport located  northeast of Morlaix, a commune of the Finistère department in the Brittany (French, Bretagne) region of France. The airport is located in the former commune of Ploujean.

Brit Air, a regional airline, had its head office on the grounds of the airport. In 2013 the airline merged into HOP!

Statistics

References

External links

  Aéroport de Morlaix - Ploujean (MXN / LFRU) (Union des Aéroports Français)
 

Airports in Brittany
Buildings and structures in Finistère
World War II airfields in France
Airfields of the United States Army Air Forces in France